Enercell is a battery brand that was sold exclusively by RadioShack at retail stores and online.

In a "battery of the month club" promotion introduced in the 1960s and abandoned in the early 1990s, RadioShack customers were issued a free wallet-sized cardboard card which entitled the bearer to one free battery a month when presented in RadioShack stores. The free Enercells were individual AA, C or D cells or 9V rectangular transistor radio batteries. Like the free tube,, testing offered in-store in the early 1970s, this small loss leader drew foot traffic.

There were two editions of a "Enercell Battery Guidebook", published in 1985 and 1990. The selector guide was later moved online. While the "battery of the month" card program ended in the 1990s, the Enercell name remained in use as RadioShack's store brand of dry cells and transistor radio batteries.

RadioShack for several years sold batteries branded "Enercell Plus" that were marketed as "Premium Alkaline" batteries.

For a long time, Enercell batteries were manufactured for RadioShack by Energizer's parent company as were all batteries sold under a RadioShack store brand. There have been instances of button batteries with the Eveready logo printed on the shell of the actual battery that were enclosed in a RadioShack Enercell package.  (Energizer's parent company used to be called Eveready Battery Company, and Eveready is one of their brands of batteries.)

References

External links
 (Redirects to the RadioShack website as of 2015)

Battery (electricity)
Consumer battery manufacturers
RadioShack